Elections in Portugal are free, fair, and regularly held, in accordance with election law.

Only the elections since the Carnation Revolution of 1974 are listed here. During the period encompassing the Constitutional Monarchy and the First Republic there were also elections, but only for a limited universe of voters. During the Estado Novo regime, from 1926 to 1974, the few elections held were not up to the democratic standards of their time and never resulted in power transfer.

Portugal elects on a national level the President and the national Parliament, the Assembly of the Republic. The President is elected for a five-year term by the people while the Parliament has 230 members, elected for a four-year term by proportional representation in multi-seat constituencies, the districts. Also on a national level, Portugal elects 21 members of the European Parliament.

The Autonomous Regions of Azores and Madeira elect their own regional government for a four-year term, usually on the same day. The first regional elections were held in 1976.

On a local level, 308 Municipal Chambers and Municipal Assemblies and 3,092 Parish Assemblies are elected for a four-year term in separate elections that usually occur on the same day.

Latest elections

2022 legislative election

2021 presidential election

|-
!style="background-color:#E9E9E9;text-align:left;" colspan="2" rowspan="2"|Candidates 
!style="background-color:#E9E9E9;text-align:left;" rowspan="2"|Supporting parties 	
!style="background-color:#E9E9E9;text-align:right;" colspan="2"|First round
|-
!style="background-color:#E9E9E9;text-align:right;"|Votes
!style="background-color:#E9E9E9;text-align:right;"|%
|-
|style="width: 10px" bgcolor=#FF9900 align="center" | 
|align=left|Marcelo Rebelo de Sousa
|align=left|Social Democratic Party, People's Party
|align="right" |2,531,692
|align="right" |60.66
|-
|style="width: 5px" bgcolor=#FF66FF align="center" | 
|align=left|Ana Gomes
|align=left|People–Animals–Nature, LIVRE
|align="right" |540,823
|align="right" |12.96
|-
|style="width: 5px" bgcolor=#202056 align="center" | 
|align=left|André Ventura
|align=left|CHEGA
|align="right" |497,746
|align="right" |11.93
|-
|style="width: 5px" bgcolor=red align="center" | 
|align=left|João Ferreira
|align=left|Portuguese Communist Party, Ecologist Party "The Greens"
|align="right" |179,764
|align="right" |4.31
|-
|style="width: 5px" bgcolor= align="center" | 
|align=left|Marisa Matias
|align=left|Left Bloc, Socialist Alternative Movement
|align="right" |165,127
|align="right" |3.96
|-
|style="width: 5px" bgcolor=#00ADEF align="center" | 
|align=left|Tiago Mayan Gonçalves
|align=left|Liberal Initiative
|align="right" |134,991
|align="right" |3.23
|-
|style="width: 5px" bgcolor=LightSeaGreen align="center" | 
|align=left|Vitorino Silva
|align=left|React, Include, Recycle
|align="right" |123,031
|align="right" |2.95
|-
|colspan="3" align=left style="background-color:#E9E9E9"|Total valid
|width="65" align="right" style="background-color:#E9E9E9"|4,173,174
|width="40" align="right" style="background-color:#E9E9E9"|100.00
|-
|align=right colspan="3"|Blank ballots
|width="65" align="right" |47,164
|width="40" align="right" |1.11
|-
|align=right colspan="3" |Invalid ballots
|width="65" align="right"|38,018
|width="40" align="right"|0.89
|-
|colspan="3" align=left style="background-color:#E9E9E9"|Total
|width="65" align="right" style="background-color:#E9E9E9"|4,258,356
|width="40" align="right" style="background-color:#E9E9E9"|
|-
|colspan=3|Registered voters/turnout
||10,847,434||39.26
|-
|colspan=5 align=left|Source: Comissão Nacional de Eleições
|}

Election results 1975–2022

Evolution graphic

Results summary

Presidential elections

Under the Portuguese Constitution adopted in 1976, in the wake of the 1974 Carnation Revolution, the President is elected to a five-year term; there is no limit to the number of terms a president may serve, but a president who serves two consecutive terms may not serve again in the next five years after the second term finishes or in the following five years after his resignation. The official residence of the Portuguese President is the Belém Palace.

The President is elected in a two-round system: if no candidate reaches 50% of the votes during the first round, the two candidates with the most votes face each other in a second round held two weeks later. , the 1986 presidential election was the only time a Portuguese presidential election was taken into a second round.

The most recent election was held in 2021 and the next is expected to be in 2026.

Local elections
 1976 Portuguese local elections
 1979 Portuguese local elections
 1982 Portuguese local elections
 1985 Portuguese local elections
 1989 Portuguese local elections
 1993 Portuguese local elections
 1997 Portuguese local elections
 2001 Portuguese local elections
 2005 Portuguese local elections
 2009 Portuguese local elections
 2013 Portuguese local elections
 2017 Portuguese local elections
 2021 Portuguese local elections

The next local elections are scheduled to be held in September/October 2025.

Autonomous Regions elections
Portugal has two autonomous regions, Azores and Madeira, that elect their own representatives for the regional parliaments every 4 years. The first elections were in 1976 and usually they were both held in the same day until 2007 when Madeira held an early election and Azores held its election the next year. The last election in Azores was in October 2020, and  Madeira held an election on September 2019.

 Elections in Azores
 Elections in Madeira

European Parliament elections
 European Parliament election, 1987
 European Parliament election, 1989
 European Parliament election, 1994
 European Parliament election, 1999
 European Parliament election, 2004
 European Parliament election, 2009
 European Parliament election, 2014
 European Parliament election, 2019

Referendums
The Constitution of Portugal defines referendum in Article 115. The referendum is called by the President of Portugal, on a proposal submitted by the Assembly or the Government. The President can refuse a proposal for referendum submitted to him by the Assembly or the Government if it is found to be unconstitutional or illegal. Referendums are binding if turnout is higher than 50% of registered voters.

Citizens of Portugal have the right to submit to the Assembly an initiative for a referendum.

The referendum can be held only on "important issues concerning the national interest which the Assembly of the Republic or the Government must decide by approving an international convention or passing a legislative act" (paragraph 3). The referendum cannot be held on amendments to the Constitution, budget, taxes, finances and competences of the Assembly, except when issue is the object of an international convention, except when the international convention concerns peace or the rectification of borders.

There have been four nationwide referendums in the History of Portugal:
 Constitutional referendum, in 1933
 First abortion referendum, in 1998
 Regionalization referendum, in 1998
 Second abortion referendum, in 2007

The Constitutional referendum of 1933 did not comply with the standards of a democratic suffrage, as, for example, abstentions were counted as supportive votes. It resulted in the establishing of the Estado Novo regime.

The later three referendums, held in the context of a Western-style liberal democracy had turnout less than 50%, so they were not binding. Nonetheless, decisions of all three referendums were honoured.

See also
 Electoral calendar
 Electoral system
 Portuguese legislative elections

Notes

References

External links
Adam Carr's Election Archive
Parties and elections
Election results
Comissão Nacional de Eleições
Portuguese General Elections since 1820